Judith E. Innes (1942 – April 14, 2020) was an American academic. She ended her career as professor emerita at the College of Environmental Design at the University of California, Berkeley. Her academic work focused on the areas of public policy, planning theory and process, collaborative planning, communicative planning, and multiple areas of urban planning including transportation and water planning. She held a Ph.D. in Urban Studies and Planning from MIT and a B.A. in English Literature from Harvard University. Innes died on April 14, 2020, aged 78.

See also
 Urban planning
 Communicative planning
 Transportation planning
 Theories of urban planning

References

1942 births
2020 deaths
UC Berkeley College of Environmental Design faculty
MIT School of Architecture and Planning alumni
Harvard College alumni